Janelle Elizabeth McGee (born 25 January 1992) is an American-born Trinidad and Tobago former footballer who played as a forward for the Trinidad and Tobago women's national team.

Early life
McGee was raised in Vacaville, California.

High school and college career
McGee has attended the Vanden High School in Fairfield, California, the New Mexico Highlands University in Las Vegas, New Mexico and the California State University, Dominguez Hills in Carson, California.

International career
McGee capped for Trinidad and Tobago at senior level during the 2012 CONCACAF Women's Olympic Qualifying Tournament qualification.

International goals
Scores and results list Trinidad and Tobago' goal tally first.

References

1992 births
Living people
Citizens of Trinidad and Tobago through descent
Trinidad and Tobago women's footballers
Women's association football forwards
Trinidad and Tobago women's international footballers
Sportspeople from Vallejo, California
Soccer players from California
People from Vacaville, California
Sportspeople from the San Francisco Bay Area
American women's soccer players
New Mexico Highlands University alumni
College women's soccer players in the United States
California State University, Dominguez Hills alumni
African-American women's soccer players
American sportspeople of Trinidad and Tobago descent
21st-century African-American sportspeople
21st-century African-American women